Mount Olive, West Virginia may refer to:
Mount Olive, Fayette County, West Virginia, an unincorporated community in Fayette County
Mount Olive, Mason County, West Virginia, an unincorporated community in Mason County
Mount Olive, Mercer County, West Virginia, an unincorporated community in Mercer County
Mount Olive, Roane County, West Virginia, an unincorporated community in Roane County